Howard Russell Smith (June 17, 1949 – July 12, 2019) was an American singer and songwriter. He was the lead singer of the groups The Amazing Rhythm Aces and Run C&W. As a solo artist, he released four studio albums and charted five singles on the Billboard Hot Country Singles chart between 1984 and 1989.

Early life and career
Smith was born in Nashville and grew up in Lafayette, Tennessee. The Amazing Rhythm Aces were formed in 1972 with Smith as lead singer. The band recorded six studio albums for ABC Records before disbanding in 1981. In 1982, Smith signed with Capitol Records and released two albums for the label, Russell Smith (1982) and The Boy Next Door (1984). He later signed with Epic Records in 1988, where he released This Little Town in 1989. His highest-charting single, "I Wonder What She's Doing Tonight," peaked at number 37 on the Billboard Hot Country Singles chart in 1989. In 1993, Smith became the lead singer of bluegrass novelty group Run C&W.

Smith also found success as a songwriter, penning Number One songs for Randy Travis ("Look Heart, No Hands"), T. Graham Brown ("Don't Go to Strangers"), Don Williams ("Heartbeat in the Darkness"), and Ricky Van Shelton ("Keep It Between the Lines"). In addition, he wrote "Big Ole Brew" which became a No. 4 country hit for Mel McDaniel in 1982.

The Amazing Rhythm Aces reunited in 1994 and continued to record and tour until Smith died on July 12, 2019, at age 70, following a cancer diagnosis.

Discography

Albums

Singles

Music videos

References

External links
[ Russell Smith] at Allmusic

1949 births
2019 deaths
Singers from Nashville, Tennessee
American country singer-songwriters
American male singer-songwriters
Run C&W members
Country musicians from Tennessee
Singer-songwriters from Tennessee